= Gehraz =

- Location in Iran
- Coordinates: 37°23′26″N 48°18′53″E
- Country: Iran
- Province: Ardabil Province
- Time zone: UTC+3:30 (IRST)
  - Summer (DST): UTC+4:30 (IRDT)
- Website: https://gehraz.ir

Gehraz is a village in the Ardabil Province of Iran.
